Hydroptila is a very large genus of microcaddisflies with a worldwide distribution.

Species

Hydroptila abantica
Hydroptila abbotti
Hydroptila acadia
Hydroptila acinacis
Hydroptila acrodonta
Hydroptila acuminata
Hydroptila acuta
Hydroptila acutangulata
Hydroptila adana
Hydroptila aegyptia
Hydroptila africana
Hydroptila agosensis
Hydroptila ajax
Hydroptila alabama
Hydroptila alara
Hydroptila albicornis
Hydroptila aldricki
Hydroptila amoena
Hydroptila ampoda
Hydroptila ancistrion
Hydroptila andalusiaca
Hydroptila angulata
Hydroptila angulifera
Hydroptila angusta
Hydroptila angustata
Hydroptila anisoforficata
Hydroptila annulicornis
Hydroptila antennopedia
Hydroptila antilliarum
Hydroptila apalachicola
Hydroptila arctia
Hydroptila arethusa
Hydroptila argentinica
Hydroptila argosa
Hydroptila armata
Hydroptila armathai
Hydroptila artemis
Hydroptila artesa
Hydroptila asteria
Hydroptila astraia
Hydroptila asymmetrica Kumanski, 1990
Hydroptila atalante
Hydroptila atargatis
Hydroptila ate
Hydroptila auge
Hydroptila aurora
Hydroptila autonoe
Hydroptila batang
Hydroptila baukis
Hydroptila begap
Hydroptila bellona
Hydroptila bengkoka
Hydroptila berkait
Hydroptila berneri
Hydroptila biankii
Hydroptila bibir
Hydroptila bidens
Hydroptila bifurcata
Hydroptila bispina
Hydroptila bispinatella
Hydroptila blicklei
Hydroptila botosaneanui Kumanski, 1990
Hydroptila brailovskyi
Hydroptila bribriae
Hydroptila brigittae
Hydroptila brincki
Hydroptila brissaga
Hydroptila broweri
Hydroptila bugata
Hydroptila bumbulensis
Hydroptila calcara
Hydroptila callia
Hydroptila calundoensis
Hydroptila campanulata
Hydroptila caperata
Hydroptila carara
Hydroptila carolae
Hydroptila catamarcensis
Hydroptila chattanooga
Hydroptila cheaha
Hydroptila chelops
Hydroptila chinensis Xue & Yang, 1990
Hydroptila cintrana
Hydroptila cochlearis
Hydroptila cognata
Hydroptila consimilis
Hydroptila constricta
Hydroptila coreana Kumanski, 1990
Hydroptila cornea
Hydroptila cornuta
Hydroptila corsicana
Hydroptila cortensis
Hydroptila coscaroni
Hydroptila cottaquilla
Hydroptila coweetensis
Hydroptila crenata
Hydroptila cretosa
Hydroptila cruciata
Hydroptila cubana
Hydroptila cuneata
Hydroptila curvata
Hydroptila dampfi Ulmer, 1929
Hydroptila daun
Hydroptila dayung
Hydroptila decia
Hydroptila dejaloni
Hydroptila delineata
Hydroptila dentata
Hydroptila denza
Hydroptila desertorum
Hydroptila dikirilagoda
Hydroptila disgalera
Hydroptila ditalea
Hydroptila dominicana
Hydroptila dorsoprocessuata
Hydroptila eglinensis
Hydroptila eileithyia
Hydroptila elongata
Hydroptila englishi
Hydroptila engywuck
Hydroptila eramosa
Hydroptila erkakanae
Hydroptila ernstreichli
Hydroptila extrema
Hydroptila fiorii
Hydroptila fiskei
Hydroptila flinti
Hydroptila fonsorontina
Hydroptila forcipata
Hydroptila fortunata
Hydroptila fowlesi
Hydroptila friedeli
Hydroptila fuentaldeala
Hydroptila fuentelarbola
Hydroptila furcata
Hydroptila furcilla
Hydroptila furcula
Hydroptila furtiva
Hydroptila fuscina
Hydroptila gandhara
Hydroptila gapdoi
Hydroptila gaya
Hydroptila giama
Hydroptila giudicellorum
Hydroptila grandiosa
Hydroptila grenadense
Hydroptila grucheti
Hydroptila gunda
Hydroptila gurdi
Hydroptila halus
Hydroptila hamata
Hydroptila hamiltoni
Hydroptila hamistyla
Hydroptila harpeodes
Hydroptila helicina
Hydroptila helmali
Hydroptila hochyangha
Hydroptila hoffmannae
Hydroptila holzenthali
Hydroptila homochitta
Hydroptila howelli
Hydroptila hubenovi
Hydroptila hyllos
Hydroptila icona
Hydroptila idefix
Hydroptila incertula
Hydroptila inornata
Hydroptila insubrica
Hydroptila ion
Hydroptila isabellae
Hydroptila ivisa
Hydroptila jackmanni
Hydroptila jaruma
Hydroptila jeanae
Hydroptila judithae
Hydroptila kairos
Hydroptila kakidaensis Nazoki & Tanida, 2007
Hydroptila kalchas
Hydroptila kalonichtis
Hydroptila kaschgari
Hydroptila kebawah
Hydroptila keres
Hydroptila kieneri
Hydroptila kirilawela
Hydroptila klapperichi
Hydroptila koropa
Hydroptila koryaki
Hydroptila kreusa
Hydroptila kuehnei
Hydroptila kurukepitiya
Hydroptila lacandona
Hydroptila lagoi
Hydroptila laloka
Hydroptila latosa
Hydroptila lennoxi
Hydroptila lenora
Hydroptila libanica
Hydroptila licina
Hydroptila lidah
Hydroptila lingigi
Hydroptila lloganae
Hydroptila lonchera
Hydroptila longifilis
Hydroptila longissimus
Hydroptila losida
Hydroptila lotensis
Hydroptila luzonensis
Hydroptila lyaios
Hydroptila maculata
Hydroptila manavgatensis
Hydroptila maoae
Hydroptila mariatheresae
Hydroptila maritza
Hydroptila martini
Hydroptila martorelli
Hydroptila matsuii
Hydroptila maza
Hydroptila mazumbaiensis
Hydroptila medinai
Hydroptila melia
Hydroptila mendli
Hydroptila meralda
Hydroptila metoeca
Hydroptila metteei
Hydroptila mexicana
Hydroptila micropotamis
Hydroptila misolha
Hydroptila mitirigalla
Hydroptila modica
Hydroptila molsonai
Hydroptila morogorensis
Hydroptila morpheus
Hydroptila moselyi
Hydroptila mugla
Hydroptila nanseiensis Ito, 2011
Hydroptila narifer
Hydroptila neoleonensis
Hydroptila ngaythibaya
Hydroptila nicoli
Hydroptila nigrovalvata
Hydroptila novicola
Hydroptila nusagandia
Hydroptila oakmulgeensis
Hydroptila obscura
Hydroptila occulta
Hydroptila oemerueneli
Hydroptila ogasawaraensis Ito, 2011
Hydroptila oguranis Kobayashi, 1974
Hydroptila okaloosa
Hydroptila oknos
Hydroptila oneili
Hydroptila ornithocephala
Hydroptila ortaca
Hydroptila osa
Hydroptila ouachita
Hydroptila ovacikensis
Hydroptila palestinae
Hydroptila panchaoi
Hydroptila parachelops
Hydroptila paradenza
Hydroptila parakampsis
Hydroptila paralatosa
Hydroptila paramoena
Hydroptila parapiculata
Hydroptila parastrepha
Hydroptila paschia
Hydroptila patriciae
Hydroptila pecos
Hydroptila pectinifera
Hydroptila pedemontana
Hydroptila perdita
Hydroptila perimele
Hydroptila perplexa
Hydroptila phaon
Hydroptila phenianica Botosaneanu, 1970
Hydroptila phileos
Hydroptila phoeniciae
Hydroptila pintal
Hydroptila poirrieri
Hydroptila potosina
Hydroptila producta
Hydroptila protera
Hydroptila pulchricornis
Hydroptila pulestoni
Hydroptila pullata
Hydroptila quadrifida
Hydroptila quinaria
Hydroptila quinola
Hydroptila rastrilla
Hydroptila recurvata
Hydroptila reducta
Hydroptila remita
Hydroptila rheni
Hydroptila rhodica
Hydroptila roberta
Hydroptila robusta
Hydroptila rono
Hydroptila ruffoi
Hydroptila rumpun
Hydroptila sabit
Hydroptila salmo
Hydroptila sandersoni
Hydroptila sanghala
Hydroptila sarahai
Hydroptila sauca
Hydroptila scamandra
Hydroptila scheiringi
Hydroptila scolops
Hydroptila sederhana
Hydroptila segitiga
Hydroptila selvatica
Hydroptila sengavi
Hydroptila serrata
Hydroptila setigera
Hydroptila sicilicula
Hydroptila sidong
Hydroptila sikanda
Hydroptila simplex
Hydroptila simulans
Hydroptila singri
Hydroptila sinuosa
Hydroptila spada
Hydroptila spangleri
Hydroptila sparsa
Hydroptila spatulata
Hydroptila spinata
Hydroptila spinosa Arefina & Armitage, 2003
Hydroptila spirula
Hydroptila spirulatella
Hydroptila starmuehlneri
Hydroptila stellifera
Hydroptila strepha
Hydroptila sudip
Hydroptila sumanmalie
Hydroptila surinamensis
Hydroptila sykorai
Hydroptila sylvestris
Hydroptila tacheti
Hydroptila tagus
Hydroptila takamaka
Hydroptila talladega
Hydroptila tanduka
Hydroptila tannerorum
Hydroptila tasmanica
Hydroptila taurica
Hydroptila terbela
Hydroptila thaphena
Hydroptila thiba
Hydroptila thisa
Hydroptila thuna Olah, 1989
Hydroptila tiani
Hydroptila tigurina
Hydroptila tineoides
Hydroptila tobaga
Hydroptila tomah
Hydroptila tombolhitam
Hydroptila tong
Hydroptila tortosa
Hydroptila touroumaya
Hydroptila traunica
Hydroptila triangula
Hydroptila tridentata
Hydroptila triloba
Hydroptila trilobata
Hydroptila trullata
Hydroptila tumpul
Hydroptila tusculum
Hydroptila uncinata
Hydroptila unicuspis
Hydroptila upulmalie
Hydroptila usambarensis
Hydroptila usuguronis
Hydroptila vala
Hydroptila valesiaca
Hydroptila valhalla
Hydroptila varla
Hydroptila vazquezae
Hydroptila vectis
Hydroptila venezuelensis
Hydroptila veracruzensis
Hydroptila vichtaspa
Hydroptila viganoi
Hydroptila vilaverde
Hydroptila virgata
Hydroptila vittata
Hydroptila voticia
Hydroptila wakulla
Hydroptila warisa
Hydroptila waskesia
Hydroptila waubesiana
Hydroptila wetumpka
Hydroptila wyomia
Hydroptila xella
Hydroptila xera
Hydroptila xoncla
Hydroptila zairiensis
Hydroptila ziddensis

References

Hydroptilidae
Taxa named by Johan Wilhelm Dalman
Trichoptera genera